Gorzycki Klub Sportowy Stal Gorzyce is an association football club based in Gorzyce, Poland. Between 1992 and 2014, the club was known as Tłoki Gorzyce.

History
The club was founded in 1951 as Koło Sportowe Stal Gorzyce. They has also performed under various names, adding Tłoki to its name in 1992. The club spent a dozen seasons spent in the third division. In 2000–2004 they participated in the second league – in 2001 and 2002 came in the 10th place, which is its greatest success to date. The club plays mostly in the IV liga, but recently has been relegated to the District League.

The fans still identified with the name Stal, and in 2014 the club reverted to its historical name – Gorzycki Klub Sportowy Stal Gorzyce.

Naming History
July 1951: KS (Koło Sportowe) Stal Gorzyce 
6 April 1957: ZKS (Zakładowy Klub Sportowy) Stal Gorzyce 
1992: ZKS Stal-Tłoki Gorzyce
?: ZKS Tłoki Gorzyce
2007: Gorzycki Klub Sportowy Tłoki Gorzyce
2014: Gorzycki Klub Sportowy Stal Gorzyce

Honours
 10th place in the Second Division - 2001/02

See also
 Football in Poland

References

External links
 Strona Stal Gorzyce (Stal Gorzyce website)
 Tłoki Gorzyce - sezon po sezonie Tłoki Gorzyce - season by season (hppn.pl)

Football clubs in Poland
Association football clubs established in 1951
1951 establishments in Poland
Football clubs in Podkarpackie Voivodeship
Tarnobrzeg County